Domingo Alberto Santana (born August 5, 1992) is a Dominican professional baseball outfielder for the Tokyo Yakult Swallows of Nippon Professional Baseball (NPB). He has played in Major League Baseball (MLB) for the Houston Astros, Milwaukee Brewers, Seattle Mariners, and Cleveland Indians.

Career

Philadelphia Phillies
Santana signed as an international free agent with the Philadelphia Phillies in March 2009, receiving a $330,000 signing bonus. He made his professional debut with the GCL Phillies, slashing .288/.388/.508 in 37 games. The next year, he split the season between the Low-A Williamsport Crosscutters and the Single-A Lakewood BlueClaws, batting a cumulative .211/.329/.333 with 8 home runs and 36 RBI. In 2011, Santana was assigned to Lakewood to begin the year, and hit .269/.345/.434 with 7 home runs and 32 RBI in 96 games for the club.

Houston Astros
The Phillies traded Santana to the Houston Astros on July 31, 2011, with Jon Singleton, Jarred Cosart, and Josh Zeid, in exchange for Hunter Pence. He finished the year with the Single-A Lexington Legends, hitting .382/.447/.662 with 5 home runs and 21 RBI in 17 contests. In 2012, Santana played for the High-A Lancaster JetHawks, batting .302/.385/.536 with career-highs in home runs (23) and RBI (97). He spent the 2013 season with the Double-A Corpus Christi Hooks, posting a .252/.345/.498 slash line with a career-high 25 home runs and 64 RBI. He was added to the 40-man roster on November 20, 2013. He was assigned to Triple-A to begin the 2014 season.

The Astros promoted Santana to the major leagues from the Oklahoma City RedHawks of the Class AAA Pacific Coast League (PCL) on July 1, 2014. He debuted the same day, going 0-for-4 with three strikeouts. After batting 0-for-13 with 11 strikeouts, the Astros demoted Santana to Oklahoma City on July 6.

On March 13, 2015, Santana was optioned to the Fresno Grizzlies of the PCL.  He was recalled on June 16.  That same day, he collected his first major league hit on an RBI single to right that scored Evan Gattis.

Milwaukee Brewers
On July 30, 2015, the Astros traded Santana, Brett Phillips, Josh Hader, and Adrian Houser to the Milwaukee Brewers for Carlos Gómez and Mike Fiers. The Brewers assigned Santana to the Colorado Springs Sky Sox of the PCL, and promoted him to the major leagues on August 21. He missed most of the 2016 season with a shoulder and an elbow injury.

In spring training of 2017, Santana competed for the starting right field job, ultimately winning the job. On July 26, 2017, Santana hit the longest home run in the history of Nationals Park, a  shot which landed on the concourse behind the left field stands. Santana continued as the starting right fielder for the remainder of the season, finishing with 30 home runs and 85 RBIs in 151 games.

Before the 2018 season, the Brewers acquired Christian Yelich and Lorenzo Cain, leaving Santana to serve as a bench player for the beginning of the season. Through 189 at bats, he was hitting .249 with three home runs and 17 RBIs off the bench before being demoted to Colorado Springs on June 23. He batted .283 with eight home runs in 55 games for the Sky Sox. The Brewers recalled Santana on September 1. As a pinch hitter, Santana batted 9-for-22 (.409) in the final month of the season.

Seattle Mariners
On December 21, 2018, the Brewers traded Santana to the Seattle Mariners for Ben Gamel and Noah Zavolas. In the Mariners season opener in Japan on March 20, Santana hit a grand slam to help lift the Mariners to the win over the Athletics. 

In 2019 he batted .253/.329/.441. He had the highest strikeout percentage in the major leagues (32.3%). In 2019, on defense he led all major league outfielders in errors, with 9. On December 2, 2019, Santana was non-tendered by Seattle and became a free agent.

Cleveland Indians
On February 14, 2020, Santana was signed to a one-year contract with the Cleveland Indians, with a club option for the 2021 season. The Indians designated Santana for assignment on August 31, 2020 after he struggled to a .157/.298/.286 slash line with 2 home runs and 12 RBI in 24 games. After clearing waivers, Santana was outrighted to the Indians' alternate training site on September 4, 2020. The Indians declined their club option on Santana's contract for the 2021 season on October 30, 2020, making Santana a free agent.

Tokyo Yakult Swallows
On December 2, 2020, Santana signed with the Tokyo Yakult Swallows of Nippon Professional Baseball. On April 24, 2021, Santana made his NPB debut. Santana re-signed for the 2023 season.

Personal life
Santana's father played for the Astros' organization.

References

External links

 Career statistics - NPB.jp

1992 births
Living people
Tokyo Yakult Swallows players
Cleveland Indians players
Colorado Springs Sky Sox players
Corpus Christi Hooks players
Dominican Republic expatriate baseball players in the United States
Florida Complex League Phillies players
Houston Astros players
Lakewood BlueClaws players
Lancaster JetHawks players
Lexington Legends players
Major League Baseball outfielders
Major League Baseball players from the Dominican Republic
Milwaukee Brewers players
Oklahoma City RedHawks players
Seattle Mariners players
Sportspeople from Santo Domingo
Tigres del Licey players
Williamsport Crosscutters players